Lauber Arboretum is an arboretum located in Kakabeka Falls, Ontario. It has been developed privately by Mr. and Mrs. Bert Sitch. The arboretum includes many indigenous species, along with twenty-odd species non-indigenous to the area, which the Sitches have collected on their travels. Lauber Arboretum does not have a seed exchange program, but it is the management's practice to exchange seed and plants with horticultural institutions in Ottawa, Guelph and the Morden Research Station in Manitoba. There is ample area for expansion, with some 10,000 pine and spruce reforested.

See also
List of botanical gardens in Canada

References
Perennial Plant Association

Flora of Ontario
Arboreta in Canada
Geography of Thunder Bay District